Wouter Deprez (born 14 February 1975 in Geluwe) is a Flemish comedian and cabaretier. In 2003 he won Humo's Comedy Cup and in 2005 he won the TV quiz De Slimste Mens.

Shows
 Schellekes (2001)
 Moest ik van u zijn (2002)
 Koning Keizer Kannibaal, together with Wannes Capelle and Helder Deploige (2004)
 War (2005)
 Eelt (2007)
 Je Zal Alles Worden (2009)

Awards
 2000 - Winner Humorologie
 2002 - Finale of the Cameretten (cabaretfestival)|Camerettenfestival 
 2003 - Winner Humo’s Comedy Cup
 2004 - Jury Award Amsterdams Kleinkunstfestival

References

External links
Official website

Belgian male comedians
Living people
1975 births